Diamond Academy may refer to:
Diamond Ranch Academy, school in Utah, United States
Shree Diamond Public Academy, school in Nepal